Adrian Ernest Thorne (2 August 1937 – 29 July 2022) was an English professional footballer who scored 48 goals from 130 appearances in the Football League playing as a left winger for Brighton & Hove Albion, Plymouth Argyle, Exeter City and Leyton Orient. He was Brighton's top scorer in the 1960–61 season with 14 goals in all competitions, and his five goals against Watford on the final day of the 1957–58 season ensured their promotion to the Second Division for the first time in the club's history. He also helped Exeter City gain promotion from the Third Division in 1964. He went on to play Southern League for Cheltenham Town and Barnet.

Career
Thorne was born in Brighton on 2 August 1937, and attended Brighton, Hove and Sussex Grammar School. He was spotted by Brighton & Hove Albion as a 17-year-old playing for his school's Old Boys' team in the Sussex County League, and signed for the club in August 1954. Like many players in the 1950s, his career development was interrupted by the requirements of National Service, and he made his debut in the Third Division South on 18 January 1958, at the age of 20, scoring in a 2–0 defeat of Southend United.

Going into the final game of the season, at home to Watford, Albion needed a point to secure the Third Division South title and promotion to the Second Division for the first time in the club's history. With Dave Sexton injured, Thorne was selected to make just his seventh League appearance: he scored five goals as Albion won 6–0. Despite scoring a goal every two games, and finishing the 1960–61 season as the club's top scorer, with 14 goals in all competitions, he was never an undisputed member of the starting eleven, and towards the end of that season he asked for a transfer.

Thorne joined Second Division club Plymouth Argyle for an £8,000 fee, but made little impact. In two years, he played only 12 games, scoring twice, and moved on to Exeter City during the 1963–64 season. He became a regular in the Exeter team that gained promotion to the Third Division that season, and remained with the club for another year before signing for Second Division Leyton Orient on a free transfer in the summer of 1965. At Orient, Thorne was reunited with former Brighton teammates Dave Sexton, now managing the club, and Tony Nicholas, but he played only twice for them in the League. He went on to play Southern League football for Cheltenham Town and Barnet.

Thorne married wife Gillian when he was a Plymouth player. While at Orient, he began to train as a teacher, gaining qualifications in science and physical education, and went on to work in that profession.

Thorne died in 2022 at the age of 84.

References

1937 births
2022 deaths
English footballers
Footballers from Brighton
Association football wingers
Brighton & Hove Albion F.C. players
Plymouth Argyle F.C. players
Exeter City F.C. players
Leyton Orient F.C. players
Cheltenham Town F.C. players
Barnet F.C. players
English Football League players
Southern Football League players
People educated at Brighton, Hove and Sussex Grammar School